Year 1484 (MCDLXXXIV) was a leap year starting on Thursday (link will display the full calendar) of the Julian calendar, the 1484th year of the Common Era (CE) and Anno Domini (AD) designations, the 484th year of the 2nd millennium, the 84th year of the 15th century, and the 5th year of the 1480s decade.

Events 
 January–December 
 March 26 – William Caxton, the first printer of books in English, prints his translation of Aesop's Fables in London. 
 May 30 – Charles VIII of France (Charles l'Affable) is crowned. 
 June 22 – The first known book printed by a woman, Anna Rügerin, is an edition of Eike of Repgow's compendium of customary law, the Sachsenspiegel, produced in Augsburg.
 July 6 – Portuguese sea captain Diogo Cão finds the mouth of the Congo River.
 July 22 – Battle of Lochmaben Fair: A 500-man raiding party led by Alexander Stewart, Duke of Albany, and James Douglas, 9th Earl of Douglas, is defeated by forces loyal to Albany's brother James III of Scotland; Douglas is captured.
 August 29 – Pope Innocent VIII succeeds Pope Sixtus IV, as the 213th pope.
 September 21 – Treaty of Nottingham: A three-year truce between the kingdoms of England and Scotland is signed.
 December 5 – Pope Innocent VIII issues the Papal bull Summis desiderantes affectibus, giving the inquisition a mission to hunt heretics and witches in Germany, led by Heinrich Kramer and Jacob Sprenger.

 Date unknown 
 The first sugar mill becomes operational in the Gran Canaria.
 The first cuirassier units are formed in Austria.
 The King of Portugal appoints a commission of mathematicians to perfect tables, to help seamen find their latitude.
 Maximilian I, Duke of Burgundy, orders foreign merchants to leave Bruges. Most merchants move to Antwerp, greatly contributing to its growth as an international trading center.
 Battle of Leitzersdorf: The Imperial Army of Frederick III, Holy Roman Emperor is defeated by the Hungarians.

Births 

 January 1 – Huldrych Zwingli, Swiss religious reformer (d. 1531)
 January 17 – George Spalatin, German religious reformer (d. 1545)
 February 21 – Joachim I Nestor, Elector of Brandenburg (1499–1535) (d. 1535)
 March 4 – George, Margrave of Brandenburg-Ansbach (d. 1543)
 April 12
 Maharana Sangram Singh, Rana of Mewar (d. 1528)
 Antonio da Sangallo the Younger, Italian architect (d. 1546)
 April 23 – Julius Caesar Scaliger, Italian humanist scholar (d. 1558)
 June 25 – Bartholomeus V. Welser, German banker (d. 1561)
 July 11 – Ottaviano de' Medici, Italian politician (d. 1546)
 November 29 – Joachim Vadian, Swiss humanist and reformer (d. 1551)
 December 13 – Paul Speratus, German Lutheran (d. 1551)
 date unknown – Hosokawa Takakuni, Japanese military commander (d. 1531)
 date unknown – Luisa de Medrano, Spanish scholar  (d. 1527)
date unknown – Purandara Dasa, Indian composer and saint (d. 1564)

Deaths 
 March 4 – Saint Casimir, Prince of Poland (b. 1458)
 March 5 – Elisabeth of Bavaria, Electress of Saxony (b. 1443)
 April 9 – Edward of Middleham, Prince of Wales (b. c. 1473)
 May 1 – Adalbert of Saxony, Administrator of Mainz (1482–1484) (b. 1467)
 July 11 – Mino da Fiesole, Italian sculptor (b. c. 1429)
 July 14 – Federico I Gonzaga, Marquess of Mantua (1478–1484) (b. 1441)
 August 12 – Pope Sixtus IV (b. 1414)
 August 20 – Ippolita Maria Sforza, Italian noble (b. 1446)
 October 2 – Isabel of Cambridge, Countess of Essex (b. 1409)
 December – Premislav of Tost, Silesian ruler (b. 1425)
 date unknown
 William Sinclair, 1st Earl of Caithness (b. 1410)
 Luigi Pulci, Italian poet (b. 1432)
 Barbara von Ottenheim, German sculpture model (b. 1430)

References